Mr. Clice is a Japanese manga series written and illustrated by Osamu Akimoto. It was irregularly serialized in Shueisha's shōnen manga magazine Monthly Shōnen Jump from 1985 to 2007. It resumed publication in Jump Square (2017–2018) and Jump SQ.Rise (2018–present).

Premise
 is the top secret agent in Japan's . But after being mortally wounded on a mission, the agency transfers his brain/mind into the body of a recently deceased 20-year-old woman in order to keep him alive. Clice continues his job as a spy, embarking on dangerous missions all around the world, while dealing with the new issues he faces as a woman and hoping to eventually obtain a male body again.

Publication
Written and illustrated by Osamu Akimoto, Mr. Clice started in Shueisha's shōnen manga magazine Monthly Shōnen Jump in the December 1985 issue. It was irregularly serialized until June 6, 2007, when the magazine ceased publication. Shueisha collected its chapters in five tankōbon volumes, released from April 10, 1989, to May 1, 2003.

About nine years later, Akimoto resumed the series' publication in Jump Square, where it ran from February 3, 2017, to January 4, 2018. The series has continued in Jump SQ.Rise since April 16, 2018. Shueisha re-released the five first volumes in a new edition and released the sixth volume on November 2, 2017.

Volume list

References

External links
  
 

Action anime and manga
Comedy anime and manga
Espionage in anime and manga
Shueisha manga
Shōnen manga